Marko Kitti (born 11 July 1970 in Turku, Finland) is a Finnish author. He has published four works of fiction in the Finnish language for adult readers and a novel for Young Adult readers.  He is also the author and illustrator of the Jesper Jinx books, the middle-grade chapter book series written in the English language.  He was a candidate for the 2009 Runeberg prize.

Bibliography
Finnish publications
 Kottarainen (The Starling).   Helsinki: Arator, 2001.  Short story collection.   .
 Viidakko (The Jungle).  Helsinki: Arator, 2003.  Novel.  .
 Meidän maailma (Our world).  Helsinki: Arator, 2008.  Novel.  .
 Isiä ja poikia (Fathers and Sons).  Helsinki: Arator, 2010.  Short story collection.  .
 Oliivityttö (Olive girl).  Helsinki: Tammi, 2012.  Youth novel.  .

English publications
 Jesper Jinx.  CreateSpace, 2014.  Illustrated middle-grade chapter book.  .
 Jesper Jinx and the Sneezing Season, 2014.  CreateSpace, 2014.  Illustrated middle-grade chapter book.  .
 Jesper Jinx and the Turkish Pepper, 2015.  CreateSpace, 2015.  Illustrated middle-grade chapter book.  .
 Jesper Jinx Goes Fishing, 2015.  CreateSpace, 2015.  Illustrated middle-grade chapter book.  .
 Jesper Jinx and the Scrumptious Snacks, 2016.  CreateSpace, 2016.  Illustrated middle-grade chapter book.  .
 Jesper Jinx's Best Friend, 2016.  CreateSpace, 2016.  Illustrated middle-grade chapter book.  .
 Jesper Jinx and the Mouse Mayhem, 2017.  CreateSpace, 2017.  Illustrated middle-grade chapter book.  .
 The Piraroo, 2018.  CreateSpace, 2018.  Illustrated middle-grade chapter book.  .

See also
 Finnish literature

References

External links
 Marko Kitti website.
 The Official Jesper Jinx website.
 Tales from Puffington Hill.
 FILI: Finnish Literature Information Centre.

Living people
1970 births
Finnish writers
People from Turku